Maredo Restaurants Holding GmbH is a German restaurant chain, specialized in steaks, which was founded in 1973. 

The name MAREDO is a portmanteau of the founder's names: Manfred Holl, Karl-Heinz Reinheimer, and Udo Schlote. The current CEO is Klaus Farrenkopf.

The company is based in Düsseldorf and is responsible for over 40 restaurants in Germany and two in Austria. Maredo is the leading branch in German steak house chains which employs over 1500 People and is widely known for its South American steaks and salad buffet.

External links 
 http://www.maredo.de

https://www.maredo.de/unternehmen/

Restaurant chains in Germany
Restaurants in Austria
Steakhouses
Companies based in Düsseldorf